The Atwood number (A) is a dimensionless number in fluid dynamics used in the study of hydrodynamic instabilities in density stratified flows. 
It is a dimensionless density ratio defined as

where

  = density of heavier fluid
  = density of lighter fluid

Field of application
Atwood number is an important parameter in the study of Rayleigh–Taylor instability and Richtmyer–Meshkov instability. In Rayleigh–Taylor instability, 
the penetration distance of heavy fluid bubbles into the light fluid is a function of acceleration time scale,   where g is the gravitational acceleration and t is the time.

References

Dimensionless numbers of fluid mechanics
Fluid dynamics